The Washington Office on Latin America (WOLA) is a United States non-governmental organization (NGO) whose stated goal is to promote human rights, democracy, and social and economic justice in Latin America and the Caribbean.

The Washington Office on Latin America aims to facilitate dialogue between governmental and non-governmental actors, to monitor the impact of U.S. foreign policy on human rights, democracy and equitable development in Latin America, and to promote alternatives through reporting and advocacy. It reports on these activities in order to inform and educate policy-makers, religious and non-governmental organizations, and the general public about that impact. The briefings of WOLA bring policy-makers and the media in direct contact with Latin American leaders and experts, and the organization works closely with civil society organizations and government officials throughout the Americas.

History 

WOLA was founded in 1974 after the 1973 Chilean coup d'état. The first long-term executive director of the organization was Joseph Eldridge, who is currently the chaplain for American University. In its early years, some of WOLA's contacts were priests and nuns who lived in Latin America and bore witness to the events there.

WOLA has provided U.S. citizens and policy-makers firsthand information from Latin America. It informs the U.S. government about the effects of U.S. policy on the region. It facilitates communications and helps to sponsor visits from Latin Americans with expertise and experiences in human rights.

In 1975, WOLA acted as advisors for congressional staff for the drafting of the first major legislation that put conditions on U.S. military aid abroad regarding human-rights practices.

Current work 

WOLA has played a key role in most major Washington policy debates over human rights in Latin America since its foundation. The organization is called upon regularly to provide information and analysis to the executive branch, to multilateral organizations, to members of Congress, and to U.S. and Latin American news media.

The organization works on issues such as drug policy, rural development, violence against women, organized crime and the rights of internally displaced people. Its focusses are split between nations and issues of health and security across the nations. It operates within four networks of non-governmental organizations: the human rights community, the foreign policy community, academic think-tanks, and the community of peace, justice, solidarity and religious-based organizations.

Funding 
WOLA is funded by a combination of foreign governments, foundations, and private individuals. Its largest donors include the Royal Norwegian Ministry of Foreign Affairs, Swiss Federal Department of Foreign Affairs, and Swiss Agency for Development and Cooperation, along with the Ford Foundation, the MacArthur Foundation, Open Society Foundations, the Atlantic Philanthropies, the Libra Foundation, and the Seattle International Foundation.

In the media 
WOLA members are widely used as sources for commentary and interpretation on Latin American human rights by media outlets such as the New York Times, CNN, and the Washington Post.

References

External links
Washington Office on Latin America website

Latin America
Latin American studies
United States–Caribbean relations
Human rights organizations based in the United States
Human rights in Latin America
Non-profit organizations based in Washington, D.C.
Organizations established in 1974